, also known simply as , was a Japanese torture technique used in the 17th century to coerce Christians ("Kirishitan") to recant their faith. The victim was hung head-down by the feet. Both Japanese and Western Christians are known to have been submitted to the torture. One of the victim's hands would be held tight with a rope, but the other  would be left free so that he could signal his willingness to recant.

The technique was said to be unbearable for those submitted to it, though some particularly resilient martyrs like Lorenzo Ruiz never broke under torture. The body was often lowered into a hole, itself often filled with excrement at the bottom. Typically, a cut would be made in the forehead around their temples in order to let blood pressure decrease in the area around the head. The aim was to "break their resolve" to renounce their faith or they would eventually die. Sometimes there was a doctor to resuscitate them only to be tortured again. An estimated 2,000 Christians died as martyrs. Christians were let go after apostatizing, and in this way the Shogunate practically purged it from Japan.

A notable victim of this method of torture was Saint Lorenzo Ruiz, the first Filipino martyr to be canonized by the Roman Catholic Church.

Ana-tsurushi was made famous in the novel Silence by Shusaku Endo.

References

Boxer, C.R. The Christian Century in Japan, 1549–1650. Berkeley, Calif.: University of California Press, 1951.  (1993 reprint edition).

Asian instruments of torture
History of Christianity in Japan
17th century in Japan